Accumulation may refer to:

Finance
 Accumulation function, a mathematical function defined in terms of the ratio future value to present value
 Capital accumulation, the gathering of objects of value

Science and engineering
 Accumulate (higher-order function), a family of functions to analyze a recursive data structure in computer science
 Bioaccumulation, of substances, such as pesticides or other chemicals in an organism
 Glacier ice accumulation, an element in the glacier mass balance formula
 Metabolic trapping, a localization mechanism of the synthesized radiocompounds in human body
 Tree accumulation, in computer science, the process of accumulating data placed in tree nodes according to their tree structure
 Accumulation point, another name for a limit point
 Cumulative sum, for example cumulative distribution function, or cumulative death toll, summarized since start of a catastrophe

Other
Accumulation: None, a 2002 lo-fi album

See also
 
 Accumulator (disambiguation)